The City Gate of Capua ( or Porta delle due Torri, 'Gate of the Two Towers') was a monumental fortified gate constructed between 1234 and 1239 at Capua on the orders of Frederick II, Holy Roman Emperor.

Medieval Capua was built on the site of ancient Casilinum (while ancient Capua is today Santa Maria Capua Vetere). A Roman bridge known as the Ponte Casilino crossed the Volturno from the north. Frederick II had a new gate built on the north side of the Volturno before the bridge. The gate was built to greet travellers coming from the Papal States. The gateway itself was a Romanesque arch in a façade between two large towers. The façade was programmatically decorated with sculptures to glorify the emperor, including one of Frederick himself.

The gate was destroyed in 1557 on the orders of Fernando Álvarez de Toledo, the viceroy of Naples. Much of the sculpture is preserved today in the Museo Campano, but the sculpture of Frederick was severely damaged when French troops marched south to support the Parthenopean Republic in 1799.

Notes

Bibliography

Capua
Frederick II, Holy Roman Emperor
Gates in Italy
City gates
Former gates
1230s establishments in Europe
1557 disestablishments in Europe